The National Centre for Hydro-Meteorological Forecasting (NCHMF) is a National meteorological service of Vietnam. It belongs to Vietnam Meteorological and Hydrological Administration (VMHA) under the Ministry of Natural Resources and Environment with authority to issue forecasting/warning information for weather, climate, hydrology, water resource, marine weather (i.e. hydro-meteorology) and provide hydro-meteorology services.

References 

Governmental meteorological agencies in Asia
Government agencies established in 2003